David Reason (14 April 1897 — 17 February 1955) was a Welsh cricketer. He was a right-handed batsman and right-arm off-break bowler and wicket-keeper for Glamorgan. He was born in Cadoxton, Neath, and died in Blackheath.

Reason was a regular player for Neath cricket club during the 1920s, but made two first-class appearances for Glamorgan in 1921 and 1922, having made four appearances in the Minor Counties Championship a year previously.

At the end of his first-class career, Reason served on the Glamorgan committee, having found it difficult to fit in enough time to star in first-class cricket because of business commitments.

External links
David Reason at Cricket Archive 

1897 births
1955 deaths
Welsh cricketers
Glamorgan cricketers
Wicket-keepers